Chacabuco Department is a western department of Chaco Province in Argentina.

References

External links
Charata Municipal Website (Spanish)

Departments of Chaco Province